Cristilabrum bubulum is a species of air-breathing land snail, a terrestrial pulmonate gastropod mollusk in the family Camaenidae. This species is endemic to Australia.

References 

Gastropods of Australia
bubulum
Endangered fauna of Australia
Gastropods described in 1981
Taxonomy articles created by Polbot